KUCA or Kuca may refer to:

 KUCA (FM), a radio station (91.3 FM) licensed to Conway, Arkansas, United States
 Kuca (footballer), a Cape Verdean footballer
 Kuća, the Serbo-Croatian name of the 1975 film The House
 Oneida County Airport (ICAO code KUCA)